The Men's under-23 time trial of the 2012 UCI Road World Championships cycling event took place on 17 September in and around Valkenburg, Netherlands.

Anton Vorobyev took Russia's first gold medal in the event, since Mikhail Ignatiev won in Madrid in 2005, denying Australia's Rohan Dennis and Damien Howson by 44.39 and 51.12 seconds respectively.

Final classification

References

External links

Men's under-23 time trial
UCI Road World Championships – Men's under-23 time trial